Federal elections were held in Belgium on June 13, 1999 to elect members of the Chamber of Representatives and Senate. The elections were held on the same day as the European elections and the regional elections. The Flemish Liberals and Democrats (VLD) became the largest party.

The Christian Democrats (CVP/PSC) suffered historic losses due to the dioxine affair that broke loose that year.  Jean-Luc Dehaene's reign of eight years came to an end. Verhofstadt formed a six-party coalition comprising the liberal (VLD and PRL), socialist (SP and PS), and green parties (Agalev and Ecolo).  It was the first liberal-led government since 1938, and the first since 1958 that didn't include a Christian Democratic party.

Results

Chamber of Representatives

Senate

Belgium
Belgium
Federal
Federal elections in Belgium